Jan Cobus was a 17th century Flemish tapestry weaver. 

His work is included in the collections of the Seattle Art Museum, the Rijksmuseum, Amsterdam and the Getty Museum, Los Angeles.

References

Flemish artists (before 1830)